Witmarsum may refer to:

 Witmarsum, Friesland, a small village in the Netherlands
 Witmarsum, Santa Catarina, a municipality in Brazil